The Sámi People's Party is a Norwegian political party, founded on 15 October 1999, without parliamentary representation, that refers to the Sámi ethnic minority in Northern Norway.

References

External links 
 Official website  (in Northern Sámi and Norwegian)

Political parties in Norway
Political parties of minorities in Norway
Sámi in Norway
Sámi politics
1999 establishments in Norway
Political parties established in 1999
Indigenist political parties